Palaichori Morphou is a village located in the Nicosia District of Cyprus on the E 903 road. 
The village  stands at an altitude of 930 m. Palaichori Morphou is separated from Palaichori Oreinis by the Serrache River.

References

External links
 
palaichori.com Guide to the Village of Palaichori 

Communities in Nicosia District